Ellie Rodriguez (née Naranjo) is a Cuban-American journalist and television personality.

Early life and education
Rodriguez was born to Cuban parents, Adrian and Maria de las Nieves Naranjo. She graduated with honors from the University of Miami in 2003 with a double major in broadcast journalism and theatre arts.

Career
Ellie began her career as the host of Keepin It Reel on Mun2 in 2004. She also co-hosted and reported their entertainment variety programs. In October 2006, she joined WSVN's Deco Drive.

In 2008, she became the host of NuvoTV's Model Latina, a reality competition show in which aspiring models compete against each other in fashion and cultural challenges. In 2011, she was replaced as the series host by Jazmín López.

References

External links

Year of birth missing (living people)
Living people
American people of Cuban descent
American television reporters and correspondents
Journalists from Florida
Television anchors from Miami
People from Miami
University of Miami School of Communication alumni